Al Lewis (April 18, 1901April 4, 1967) was an American lyricist, songwriter and music publisher. He is thought of mostly as a Tin Pan Alley era lyricist; however, he did write music on occasion as well.  Professionally he was most active during the 1920s working into the 1950s.  During this time, he most often collaborated with popular songwriters Al Sherman and Abner Silver. Among his most famous songs are "Blueberry Hill" and "You Gotta Be a Football Hero".

Songwriters on Parade
Between 1931 and 1934, during the last days of Vaudeville, Lewis and several other hitmakers of the day performed in a revue called "Songwriters on Parade", performing all across the Eastern seaboard on the Loew's and Keith circuits.

Career revival in the 1950s
Lewis's career received a boost in 1956 when "Blueberry Hill", a song he had co-written in the 1940s with Larry Stock, became a big hit for Fats Domino. Two years later Lewis and Sylvester Bradford, a blind African-American songwriter, wrote "Tears on My Pillow", which was a hit for Little Anthony and the Imperials.

Hit songs
 1926 "Gonna Get a Girl" composed by Howard Simon
 1929 "He's So Unusual"
 1929 "Good Morning, Good Evening, Good Night"
 1930 "Livin' in the Sunlight, Lovin' in the Moonlight"
 1931 "Ninety-Nine Out of a Hundred", a Rudy Vallee hit vocal.
 1931 "Got the Bench, Got the Park"
 1933 "Now's the Time to Fall in Love", an Eddie Cantor hit vocal.
 1933 "You Gotta Be a Football Hero"
 1936 "Hypnotized"
 1940 "Blueberry Hill"
 1941 "Rose O'Day"
 1958 "Tears on My Pillow", written with Sylvester Bradford, recorded by Little Anthony and the Imperials
 1959 "I'm Ready" with Fats Domino & Sylvester Bradford

References

External links
 Al Lewis recordings at the Discography of American Historical Recordings.

1901 births
1967 deaths
20th-century American musicians
Jewish American songwriters
Musicians from New York City
Songwriters from New York (state)
20th-century American Jews